Celso Frateschi (born February 9, 1952) is a Brazilian actor, director, author and politician.

Biography 
Celso was born in São Paulo, Brazil. He is affiliated with the Workers'Party and married the architect and set designer Sylvia Moreira, father of the also actor André Frateschi and Ludmila Frateschi.

He was Municipal Secretary of Culture of São Paulo, in the management of Marta Suplicy, and Secretary of Culture in São Bernardo do Campo.

He owns Teatro Ágora, in São Paulo. He played Richard III and The Dream of a Ridiculous Man with great success. Actor, director and author, he was one of the founders of the groups Teatro Núcleo Independente, Teatro Pequeno, and Ágora - Center for Theatrical Development, of São Paulo. He made his debut at the São Paulo Arena Theater in 1980, in Augusto Boal's Teatro Jornal 1ª Edição. He worked with some of the most notable directors of Brazilian theater, such as Enrique Diaz, José Possi Neto and Domingos de Oliveira.

He wrote A epidemia, with Paulo Maurício, and Os Imigrantes, with which he debuted as director and received, in 1978, the 'Mambembe Award' for best actor. He received the 'Shell Award' for best actor in 1988 for Eras by Heiner Müller.

He is a licensed professor at the School of Dramatic Arts at USP. He was Municipal Secretary of Culture in Santo André and São Paulo, in the management of Marta Suplicy, in 2003 and 2004. He was Funarte's president until October 2008, when he resigned. In a letter entitled "The transatlantic phantom", published at the night of August 6, Frateschi says he will not resist the "articulated movement of some officials and some sectors of the Ministry of Culture to destabilize my management in the Funarte presidency."

In August 2008, Celso Frateschi inaugurated his blog on the website of Bravo! Magazine. He also produced Uncle Vanya by Anton Chekhov.

Filmography

Television
 1985 Uma Esperança no Ar - Rui
 1994 Memorial de Maria Moura - Liberato
 1994 Você Decide - Pressão Total
 1998 Pecado Capital - Pacheco
 1998 Torre de Babel - Delegado
 2000 A Muralha - Afonso Góis
 2001 Presença de Anita - Igor
 2002 O Beijo do Vampiro - Ezequiel
 2004 Começar de Novo - Mikhail
 2004 Um Só Coração - Ernesto da Silva
 2005 Belíssima - Juiz
 2005 Carga Pesada - Casão
 2005 Essas Mulheres - Pedro Camargo
 2006 A Diarista - Nestor
 2006 Sinhá Moça - Inácio
 2007 Paixões Proibidas - Álvaro de Sousa
 2008 Casos e Acasos - 3 Episodes
 2008 Queridos Amigos - Dr. Hélio Gomes Vianna
 2009 Uns Braços - Borges Solicitor
 2009 Força-Tarefa - Valfrido
 2010 Escrito nas Estrelas - Jardel
 2011 O Astro - Nelson Cerqueira
 2013 José do Egito - Jacó
 2014 Sessão de Terapia - Guilherme Damasceno 
 2016 Êta Mundo Bom! - Barão de Goytacazes 
 2016 3% - Cause Leader

Cinema
 1997 O Trabalho dos Homens - Police
 1997 Os Matadores
 1998 Contos de Lygia
 2001 Bufo & Spallanzani - Dr. Ribeiroles
 2001 Mater Dei
 2001 Sonhos Tropicais - Sales Guerra
 2003 Cristina Quer Casar
 2006 Veias e Vinhos - Uma História Brasileira - Capitão
 2018 Paraíso Perdido - Delegado

References

External links 

 

1952 births
Living people
Male actors from São Paulo
Brazilian people of Italian descent
Brazilian male television actors
Brazilian male film actors
Brazilian directors
Brazilian theatre directors
Workers' Party (Brazil) politicians